Psoralea plicata is a herb species in the genus Psoralea found in Pakistan.

P. plicata contains plicadin, a coumestan and plicatin A and B, two hydroxycinnamic acids.

References

External links
 Psoralea plicata on www.efloras.org

Psoraleeae
Plants described in 1812